Metachanda hamonella is a moth species in the oecophorine tribe Metachandini. It was described by Pierre Viette in 1954.

References

Oecophorinae
Moths described in 1954
Taxa named by Pierre Viette